Santa Sofía is a town and municipality in the Department of Boyacá, part of the subregion of the Ricaurte Province, Colombia. Santa Sofía borders Moniquirá in the north, Gachantivá in the west, Villa de Leyva in the southeast, Sutamarchán in the south, Saboyá in the southwest, and Puente Nacional, Santander in the west.

Etymology 
Originally, Santa Sofía was called Guatoque, a name derived from Muysccubun, meaning "creek of the mountain". The name was changed in 1906 to Santa Sofía, because mail that was meant to go to Guateque, in southern Boyacá, was accidentally delivered in Guatoque. The name Santa Sofía was given to the town honouring Sofía Ángulo de Reyes, spouse of the then president of Colombia Rafael Reyes.

History 
The area of Santa Sofía before the Spanish conquest was inhabited by the Muisca, who used the area to cross the lands towards the northern parts of their Muisca Confederation. 

It was in nearby Sorocotá that De Quesada and his men first discovered the potato in 1537 together with maize and beans alongside many aspects of local culture and customs as described in the History of the conquest of the New kingdom of Granada by Juan de Castellanos.

Within the boundaries of the municipalities is located the Hoyo de la Romera, a sinkhole where unfaithful Muisca women were punished.

Santa Sofía, then as Guatoque, was founded by Spanish colonists ordered by Amar y Borbón on January 10, 1810, just before the independence of Colombia from the Spanish Empire was called.

Economy 
Main economical activities of Santa Sofía are livestock farming and agriculture, especially curuba, tomatoes and strawberries. Other products cultivated are potatoes, maize, peas, beans, sugarcane and yuca.

Tourism 
Santa Sofía is a rural community that gives access to the Guatoque Páramo and the Paso del Ángel, an ancient indigenous road. There are various caves and waterfalls located around Santa Sofía.

Gallery

References 

Municipalities of Boyacá Department
Populated places established in 1810
1810 establishments in the Spanish Empire
Muisca Confederation